Flavien Conne (born 1 April 1980) is a Swiss former professional ice hockey player. He played over 600 games in the Swiss National League A (NLA). He was selected by the Los Angeles Kings in the 8th (250th overall) of the 2000 NHL Entry Draft.

Conne competed at both the 2002 and 2006 Winter Olympics with the Switzerland men's national ice hockey team.

Curiosity 
February 2016 he appeared as himself in a heated ice-hockey scene of TV movie The Legacy Run with former rugby player turned author/actor Luca Tramontin. The movie is thought as the prequel-intro to the investigative series "Sport Crime" in which Conne is expected to feature in a number of episodes.

Career statistics

Regular season and playoffs

International

References

External links

1980 births
Living people
HC Ambrì-Piotta players
HC Fribourg-Gottéron players
Genève-Servette HC players
Ice hockey players at the 2002 Winter Olympics
Ice hockey players at the 2006 Winter Olympics
Los Angeles Kings draft picks
HC Lugano players
Olympic ice hockey players of Switzerland
Swiss ice hockey centres